David A. Hodell (born 1958) is a geologist and paleoclimatologist. He currently holds the position of Woodwardian Professor of Geology in the Department of Earth Sciences at the University of Cambridge, where he is also a fellow of Clare College.  He is a dual citizen of the United Kingdom and the United States. Previously, he taught at the University of Florida from 1986–2008, earning the rank of full professor in geological sciences. Hodell was also the director of the Stable Isotope Laboratory from 1996–2008. Hodell earned his Ph.D. in 1986 in oceanography from the University of Rhode Island after earning his bachelor of arts in 1980 in geology from the University of Vermont.

Research by Hodell, Brenner, Curtis and Guilderson was instrumental in rethinking the Maya Collapse.  Climate data derived from core samples retrieved from closed lake systems in the Mexico's Yucátan and Guatemala showed a period of extensive drought.  In 1995, Hodell, Curtis and Brenner published a paleoclimate record from Lake Chichancanab on the Yucatán Peninsula that showed an intense, protracted drought occurred in the 9th century AD and coincided with the Classic Maya collapse. Hodell, Curtis and Brenner returned to Lake Chichancanab in May 2000 and collected new cores while being filmed for a BBC production on drought and Maya prehistory, as part of the BBC series "Ancient Apocalypse".    These new cores showed that the devastating drought of the ninth century AD was only one in a series of drought episodes on the Yucatán Peninsula during the last 2,600 years. This research team points out that these dry events occur about every 208 years and coincide with episodes of greater solar intensity that have been shown previously to have a periodicity of 206 years. This suggests that the roughly bicentennial droughts that occur in the Maya lowlands are controlled partly by changes in solar intensity.

In 2007, Hodell was elected a fellow of the American Geophysical Union. Hodell's research areas include: lake sediment cores; speleothems; marine sediment cores; and geoarchaeology.

In October 2008, Hodell was appointed to the position of Woodwardian Professor of Geology at the University of Cambridge in the United Kingdom. He became a recipient of the Milutin Milankovic Medal in 2018  and was elected as a fellow to the American Association for the Advancement of Science (AAAS) in 2020.

Selected works

References

External links
University of Florida's  Land Use and Environmental Change Institute (LUECI)
University of Florida Department of Geological Sciences
 David A. Hodell CV on Hodell's website
 News article on Hodell's geological core research
 "Getting to the Core of Climate Change"
 "Millennial-Scale Instability of the Antarctic Ice Sheet During the Last Glacialization" article by Hodell in Science

1958 births
Living people
University of Florida faculty
Fellows of the American Geophysical Union
University of Rhode Island alumni
University of Vermont alumni
Fellows of Clare College, Cambridge
American geologists
Woodwardian Professors of Geology